Sharon was a Philippine TV's Sunday night musical talk show that aired on ABS-CBN and was hosted by Sharon Cuneta.

Series overview

Premise
The musical gabfest served as Cuneta's TV comeback in 1998 after a yearlong hiatus from show business. The show had a successful six-year run, becoming a top-rated weekly program, and clinched Best Talk Show honors and Best Talk Show Host accolades for Cuneta, who took another break from TV in 2004 and returned in 2006 with the latest incarnation of the Sharon show. The show was honored as Best Entertainment Program of 2007 by the Catholic Mass Media Awards and highly commended in the Asian Television Awards. In 2009, the show topped the Sunday night TV ratings and continued its winning streak in 2010 starting off with the Megastar's birthday bash, showbiz's most awaited new year salvo.

Cancellation
In August 2010 episode, Sharon herself announced that the show would be canceled on October 3, 2010, replaced by Star Power, which she co- hosted with singers Christian Bautista and Erik Santos on October 10, 2010.

Following Cuneta's transfer to TV5 in 2011, a new talk show was commissioned titled Sharon: Kasama Mo, Kapatid which aired from May 14, 2012, to January 4, 2013.

See also
List of programs previously aired by ABS-CBN
Sharon: Kasama Mo, Kapatid
The Sharon Cuneta Show

References

ABS-CBN original programming
Philippine television talk shows
1998 Philippine television series debuts
2010 Philippine television series debuts
Filipino-language television shows